Mahamat Saleh (born 6 June 1980) is a Chadian former professional footballer who played as a midfielder.

Career
Saleh was born in N'Djamena, Chad. Saleh played on the professional level in Ligue 2 for Angers SCO.

References

1980 births
Living people
People from N'Djamena
Association football midfielders
Chadian footballers
Chad international footballers
Ligue 2 players
Angers SCO players
US Albi players
Chadian expatriate footballers
Expatriate footballers in France
Chadian expatriate sportspeople in France